Kim Evans  (born January 1951) is an arts consultant and documentary filmmaker.

Evans spent ten years on The South Bank Show and Channel 4. She was head of music and arts at the BBC and then executive director arts at Arts Council England. Evans is chair of Clean Break theatre company and a member of the Parole Board for England and Wales. Until July 2014, she was a trustee of the Heritage Lottery Fund. She was made a member of the Order of the British Empire in 2007 for Services to the Arts. She is a trustee of the National Portrait Gallery.

References

External links 
Why is storytelling necessary in today's world | Kim Evans | Interview OBE | Zealous X Talks.

1951 births
Living people
BBC people
Officers of the Order of the British Empire
Trustees of charities
British filmmakers
Fellows of the Royal Television Society
Trustees of the National Portrait Gallery